Table tennis women's team at the 2018 Commonwealth Games was held at the Oxenford Studios on the Gold Coast, Australia from April 5 to 8.

Group stage
2 points were awarded for won tie, and 1 point for lost tie.

Group 1

Group 2

Group 3

Group 4

Knockout stage

Bracket

Quarterfinals

Semifinals

Bronze medal

Final

References

Women's team
Common